Uriel Matías Ramírez Kloster (born 19 August 1999) is an Argentine professional footballer who plays as a forward for Aldosivi.

Career
Ramírez Kloster started his career in his homeland with Vélez Sarsfield, before joining Aldosivi in 2019. After a year in the latter's youth system, the forward made the breakthrough into their first-team squad in late-2020 under manager Guillermo Hoyos. He was initially an unused substitute for a Copa de la Liga Profesional match with Estudiantes, though soon made his senior debut on 6 November in the same competition against Argentinos Juniors; replacing Leandro Maciel near the end of the second half.

Career statistics
.

Notes

References

External links

1999 births
Living people
Footballers from Buenos Aires
Argentine footballers
Association football forwards
Aldosivi footballers